The Cavan Junior Football Championship is an annual Gaelic football competition contested by lower-tier Cavan GAA clubs. It was first competed for in 1913. The winner qualifies to represent their county in the Ulster Club Championship and in turn, go on to the All-Ireland Junior Club Football Championship. The current champions are Drumlane after beating Arva in the 2022 final.

Format
14 teams will contest the Cully's Craft Bakery Junior Championship.

The J.F.C. shall be run on a league basis up to the Quarter-Final stage and Knock-out thereafter. Each team will play 4 rounds in the league phase against different opponents with the fixtures decided by a random draw at the conclusion of each round. Placings in the league stage shall be decided in accordance with rule 6.21 of the GAA Official Guide 2016 as amended below:

6.21 (4) If a Championship is partly organised on a League basis, the following Regulations shall apply:
(a) League Results shall be credited as follows: 2 points for a win, and one for a draw.
(b) If a Team is Disqualified or Retires during the course of a League Stage, its played games shall stand and its un-played games shall be awarded to the opposing teams.
(c) As provided for in this Competition Regulation, when teams finish with equal points for Qualification for the Concluding Stages, or for Promotion or Relegation, the tie shall be decided by the following means and in the order specified: (i) Play-Off.

The top 8 teams in the league progress to the Quarter-Finals. The winner will be promoted to the Cavan Intermediate Football Championship.

Top winners

Roll of honour

References

External links
Cavan at ClubGAA
Official Cavan GAA Website

Cavan GAA Football championships
Junior Gaelic football county championships